About Last Night may refer to:

Film and television
 About Last Night (1986 film), an American comedy-drama directed by Edward Zwick
 About Last Night (2014 film), an American remake of the 1986 film, directed by Steve Pink
 "About Last Night" (Dexter), a 2008 TV episode
 "About Last Night" (Medium), a 2009 TV episode
 "About Last Night..." (South Park), a 2008 TV episode

Music
 About Last Night... (album), by Mabel, or the title song, 2022
 About Last Night (EP), by New Buffalo, or the title song, 2001
 About Last Night, an album by Stephen Ashbrook, or the title song, 1993
 "About Last Night", a song by Vitamin C from Vitamin C, 1999

Other uses
 About Last Night, a podcast hosted by Brad Williams and Adam Ray